Gargoyles is a platform game developed by Disney Software and published by Buena Vista Interactive for the Sega Genesis in 1995. It is an adaptation of the Disney animated series of the same title.

Gameplay
The game loosely follows the plot of the show. The player controls the protagonist Goliath as he seeks to put an end to the Eye of Odin, a corrupted magical talisman which can transform whoever comes to possess it. Demona, the most recent owner of the Eye, ultimately becomes the main antagonist. The game contains 5 levels bookended by short cinematics which explain the story thus far, each level concluding with a boss encounter.

Throughout the game, Goliath would contend with the Vikings who ransacked Castle Wyvern in the past, as well as new, robotic foes who attack him in the present era across various venues, such as Manhattan rooftops and a subway. His arsenal of attacks to defend himself include various strikes with his fists, grapples, throws, and leaping maneuvers. He is also able to pump his wings once to increase his jumping distance, as well as climb along walls and ceilings with his claws. Gargoyles boasts a hand-drawn appearance to Goliath, Demona and the Viking enemies (not unlike Virgin Interactive's Aladdin also for the Genesis), but also a CGI-modeled look for the robot enemies.

Release
The game was intended to be released exclusively for the Sega Genesis on May 15, 1995, but it ended up being released in November 1995, and received reviews late in the year. A Super NES version planned for a Christmas 1995 release was cancelled. In December 2012, Chris Shrigley, who programmed the game, released the source code for educational purposes to the public.

During Disney D23 in 2022, an announcement trailer for a remastered version was released. At this time, no information was shown other than that it is currently being made.

Reception
The game was very well received by most critics. Scott Larry from GamePro called it "one of the best games for the Genesis, right next to Earthworm Jim 2" and added: "Topnotch gameplay and great graphics made Gargoyles one of the year's best. It's a stone-cold blast!" Game Informer awarded it a score of 8.5/10, commenting: "Disney Interactive made Gargoyles into everything that would be expected from Disney's animation division. All the character movements look like a cartoon in themselves. If you found joy in Aladdin and The Lion King you'll probably receive the same thrill from Gargoyles but on a darker level". Mike Salmon of Game Players and Next Generation gave it four stars and 85% ratings respectively for its "simply amazing" graphics and being "a real treat to play", calling it one of the biggest surprises and best Genesis games of the year, and positively comparing it to "similar in looks" to Demon's Crest for the SNES, adding that "with this and Toy Story, Disney has done more with the Genesis than Sega has ever done". The four reviewers of Electronic Gaming Monthly were more conflicted about the game, giving it scores ranging from 4.0 to 7.5 out of 10. They all agreed that the game's controls were frustrating, but differed in their opinions of the gameplay and graphics (from "dingy" to "aren't the best" to "really impressive").

References

External links

Gargoyles'' at GameFAQs

1995 video games
Cancelled Super Nintendo Entertainment System games
Commercial video games with freely available source code
Disney video games
Gargoyles (TV series)
Platform games
Sega Genesis games
Sega Genesis-only games
Single-player video games
Video games based on animated television series
Video games scored by Michael Giacchino
Video games developed in the United States
Video games set in New York City
Video games set in Scotland
Video games set in 1994
Video games set in the Middle Ages
North America-exclusive video games